Gere Glück is a retired West German slalom canoeist who competed from the mid-1960s to the early 1970s. He won a bronze medal in the C-2 team event at the 1967 ICF Canoe Slalom World Championships in Lipno.

References

German male canoeists
Living people
Year of birth missing (living people)
Medalists at the ICF Canoe Slalom World Championships